Harry Maxwell "Max" Hayward (28 July 1924, London – 18 March 1979, Oxford) was a British lecturer on and translator of Russian literature. He has been described as "the best and most prolific translator of Russian prose into English since Constance Garnett".

Biography
After schooling in London and Liverpool, Hayward went to Magdalen College, Oxford in 1942 on a scholarship to study German. He soon dropped German for Russian, graduating with a first-class degree in 1945. He remained in Oxford for two more years before being proposed by Isaiah Berlin for a scheme for young scholars to be attached to the British Embassy in Moscow. He instead opted to study in 1946-7 at Charles University of Prague. The British Foreign Office then appointed him to the Moscow embassy and he arrived in September 1947, where he would remain for two years. When required to translate for the British ambassador on a visit to Joseph Stalin in the Kremlin, Hayward was too dumb-struck to speak.

Returning to Oxford in 1949, Hayward became lecturer in Russian, moving to Leeds University in 1952. In 1955 he returned to work at the British Embassy in Moscow, but his posting was cut short. In 1956 he was taken on by St Antony's College, Oxford. He supervised a number of students who went on to prominent careers, including Strobe Talbott.

Although Hayward published no academic monograph and his writings were widely scattered in introductions to books and articles in journals, he became a well-known authority on Russian literature. He was best known as a translator (often jointly with colleagues) of the works of Vladimir Mayakovsky, Isaac Babel, Nadezhda Mandelstam, Aleksandr Solzhenitsyn, Boris Pasternak, Andrei Sinyavsky, Andrei Amalrik, Anna Akhmatova and many others.

His first full-scale translation, jointly with Manya Harari, was of Pasternak's novel Doctor Zhivago, a translation they began in 1957. Hayward had known Pasternak's family in Oxford and had once heard Pasternak read his poetry in Moscow in 1948.

He received the PEN Translation Prize in 1971.

He died in Oxford, aged 54, in 1979.

See also
Hope Against Hope by Nadezhda Mandelstam
A Spy in the Archives: A Memoir of Cold War Russia by Shelia Fitzpatrick

References

External links
 Leonard Schapiro, "Max Hayward (1924–1979)", The New York Review of Books, July 19, 1979.

1924 births
1979 deaths
Linguists from the United Kingdom
Translators of Boris Pasternak
Translators of Anna Akhmatova
Alumni of Magdalen College, Oxford
Charles University alumni
Academics of the University of Leeds
Fellows of St Antony's College, Oxford
20th-century translators
20th-century linguists
British expatriates in Czechoslovakia